Andreína Gomes Cornejo (born August 17, 1986 in Caracas, Venezuela), is a pageant titleholder. She was the official winner of the Miss Tourism Planet 2008 pageant held in  Thessaloniki, Greece in July, 2008. Gomes was crowned Miss Continente Americano Venezuela 2009 on June 12, 2009, during the Sambil Model / Miss Earth Venezuela 2009 pageant.

She also represented her country Venezuela in the Miss Continente Americano 2009 pageant in Guayaquil (Ecuador) on September 26, and placed in the 6 finalists.

References

External links
 Miss Earth / Sambil Model Venezuela Official Website
 Miss Continente Americano Official Page
 Miss Tourism Planet Official Page

1986 births
Living people
People from Caracas
Venezuelan female models